Anutpāda is a Buddhist concept for the absence of an origin. In Mahayana Buddhism, "anutpāda" is often symbolized by the letter A.

Etymology
"Anutpāda" means "having no origin", "not coming into existence", "not taking effect", "non-production".
 "An" also means "not", or "non"
 "Utpāda" means "genesis", "coming forth", "birth"

Usage in Buddhist tradition
The Buddhist tradition uses the term "anutpāda" for the absence of an origin or sunyata (voidness). Anutpāda means that dharmas, the constituting elements of reality, do not come into existence. Atiśa:

Chandrakirti, in his Yuktisastikavrrti, states:

According to Nakamura in his study of Advaita  Vedanta, the Buddhist paramārtha, "highest truth", is identified with anutpāda  The term paramārtha is a synonym for tattva, tathata, sunyata, animitta, bhutakoti and dharmadhatu. One who understands sunyata, anutpada and dependent arising, has realized the ultimate truth and gains nirvana. Nagarjuna:

Anutpāda is one of the important features of the Prajñāpāramitā Sutras and Madhyamaka. The term is also used in the Lankavatara Sutra. According to D.T Suzuki, "anutpada" is not the opposite of "utpada", but transcends opposites. It is the seeing into the true nature of existence, the seeing that "all objects are without self-substance". Another well-known use is in Bankei's "Unborn".

Influence on Gaudapada

Gaudapada-karika characterizes Brahman-Atman Absolute with the concept of "Ajātivāda". It is a fundamental philosophical doctrine of Gaudapada. In Gaudapada-Karika, chapter III, verses 46–48, Gaudapada states that Brahman never arises, is never born, is never unborn, it rests in itself:

According to Gaudapada, the Absolute has no origin, and is not subject to birth, change and death. The Absolute is aja, the unborn eternal. The empirical world of appearances is considered Maya (unreal, changing, transitory), and not ontologically independent reality.

Gaudapada's concept of "ajāta" is similar to Nagajurna's  Madhyamaka philosophy. The Buddhist tradition usually uses the term "anutpāda" for the absence of an origin or śūnyatā.

But Gaudapada's perspective is quite different from Nagarjuna. Gaudapada's perspective is based on the Mandukya Upanishad. According to Gaudapada, Brahman cannot undergo alteration, so the phenomenal world cannot arise independently from Brahman. If the world cannot arise, yet is an empirical fact, than the world has to be an unreal (transitory) appearance of Brahman. And if the phenomenal world is a transitory appearance, then there is no real origination or destruction, only apparent origination or destruction. From the level of ultimate truth (paramārthatā) the phenomenal world is māyā, changing and not what it seems to be.

The Ajativada of Gaudapada, states Karmarkar, has nothing in common with the Sunyavada concept in Buddhism. While the language of Gaudapada is undeniably similar to those found in Mahayana Buddhism, Coman states that their perspective is different because unlike Buddhism, Gaudapada is relying on the premise of "Brahman, Atman or Turiya" is there and is of the nature of absolute reality.

See also
Pratītyasamutpāda
Rigpa
Ajātivāda
A in Buddhism

Notes

References

Sources

  
 
 
 
 
 
 
 
 
 
 
 

Advaita Vedanta
Buddhist philosophical concepts
Nondualism